John Denys Taylor (September 13, 1908-May 4, 1987) was a medical missionary who founded Bonda Mission Hospital within the Nyanga district in Africa in the early twentieth century. His journey with the Church of England to found the missionary in Africa began in 1937. 

Taylor was able to make strides in medicine by providing care and operations that were considered more basic within England, such as Cesarean deliveries and I.V. transfusions. The Birmingham Medical School honored Taylor with a visit to Rhodesia with the original intentions of establishing the Salisbury Medical School that was intended to admit students in 1963. After his death, the Bonda Mission Hospital expanded  to found the Bonda Mission Hospital School of Nursing.

Early life and education 
Taylor was born on September 3, 1908 in Manchester, Lancashire, England to Isaac (36) and Edith Taylor (35), residing in Manchester: 22 Birch Grove Rusholme. In 1935, he married his wife, Elsa Moira Hedges (1912), in Fylde, Lancashire. 

Taylor was trained at Warminster Theological College from 1938-1940. 

All six of his sons were born in the Bonda Mission Hospital. At the time of their brief return to Liverpool, England in 1945, his sons were the following ages: John Taylor (8), David Taylor (6), Stephen Taylor (4) and June Taylor (1). Their first son, John Taylor, was born within the first few months of their arrival to Bonda.

Career
Taylor, with his family, were religious followers of the Church of England, he yearned to become a missionary doctor. In 1937, Bishop Paget gave Taylor the opportunity to begin his journey to Bonda in the Inyanga district where he became a reverend recognized by the Church of England. With minimal to no knowledge about Africa, the climate and the culture, he traveled with his wife to become a part of this new culture. The first medical work hospital was founded through the Church of England at St. David’s Mission with the grant from the Society for the Propagation of the Gospel in Foreign Parts.

After the entrance into southern Africa in 1821, the Society for the Propagation of the Gospel in Foreign Parts(SPG) missionaries ventured to Southern Rhodesia with the first mission in St. Augustine’s Mission.  Beit Trust first funded medical work at Bonda Mission, "St. David's Mission", in 1928 with only the nursing service of Miss L Adlam, who was a retired matron who worked at the Salisbury Hospital. This was the first medical work that was accomplished in Southern Rhodesia.  These original health services closed due to lack of staffing in 1931. The original building was built by the Society for the Propagation of the Gospel in Foreign Parts. Taylor became the first physician at the reopened hospital in 1937. The goal when Taylor first arrived at the Bonda Mission Hospital was to create a connection between “God’s glory” and the spiritual connection between mental and physical health.  Soon after Taylor in 1937, Sister Lorna Page also came with SPG.  Originally, the hospital only consisted of one main block with two subsequent wards and three relatively small rooms that included the operating theater and three huts used for outpatient treatment and a dispensary for contaminated items.  

Within the first five months of Taylor’s arrival, over 200 patients were treated in the outpatient setting. With the founding of the hospital, there was a lack of resources, including staff and necessary medical equipment. There was a shortage of drugs, staff, outdated equipment and no blood bank, along with no kitchen present within the hospital. With the shortage of trained professionals, many relatives were forced to become anesthetists or took on other roles, which was only short lived. 

Birthing was originally a concern for the health program at Bonda, in certain situations patients were forced to walk over 20 kilometers to obtain medication and the tools used were not the most efficient nor sterile. There was a shortage of drugs, staff and a blood bank. Women would die as they was not access to Cesarean sections or blood transfusions, which eventually became a priority for the hospital operation. Through progress, the Bonda Mission Hospital became the inspiration for St. Faith’s Rusape.

Bishop Balya visited the eastern portions of Southern Rhodesia, specifically, first visiting the St. Augustine’s Penhalonga where the Resurrection was the main missionary group. Following this visit, his second portion of the trip was spent with Taylor at Bonda. Since Taylor started the Mission Hospital approximately 10 years prior, 20 girls had begun their nursing training. The Bonda Mission Hospital, in addition to the C.M.S. Hospital in Kampala, was used as the model for St. Francis’ hospital to bring a connection between religious faith and medicine in Africa. Taylor’s work strengthened Bishop Balya’s opinion on the Church with the impact they had on females involving medical work. This was an inspiration to look at St. Faith’s Rusape and from there Salisbury to be advertised to the Bishop of Southern Rhodesia.

As the medical superintendent, Taylor and Sister Lorna Page’s religious beliefs were able to be implemented into the practices of the hospital with it being a location of medical treatment and a place of worship. This was one of the first institutions in present-day Zimbabwe.

Expansion of the hospital 
Throughout Taylor's leadership, there was an expansion of the physical hospital space and the staff. In 1939, expansion was supported by subscriptions from Taylor's friends and family in England. This expansion allowed for the children’s ward and an entire surgical block to be completed and equipped with the necessary equipment.  In additoin, the two outpatient areas were expanded to a row of five huts that were 12 feet by 10 feet. In 1943-44 a separate maternity ward was also built. The new maternity ward did not have the luxuries of ceilings and had inefficient windows; but it was able to accommodate 300 births a year.

In 1945, a new block of two medical wards and a duty room that began the creation of the new hospital site, which was supported by the Beit Trust. The remainder of the buildings were funded by the Beit Trust with equal accommodations from the Government and a donation from Canon Broderick, specifically, towards the children’s wards. In 1947, the medical wards were completed (Paget) and in 1950 the children’s wards (Broderick) were completed. 

Surgery became a common practice for Taylor and the hospital, as there continuously were an increase in the number of applicants for the positions with only a select few positions. With the success of the Bonda Mission Hospital, Cesarean deliveries and I.V. transfusions were presented into the medical field in Zimbabwe. However, this brought the opportunity for further complications.

In 1951, the surgical block was completed and equipped with the necessary materials for operation and the original hospital building was then used for outpatient waiting rooms and exam rooms.

In 1951, pulmonary tuberculosis became a health concern as cases increased with a shortage of beds due to the high demand. In Southern Rhodesia, the tuberculosis outbreak was first noticed within the mines, followed by the towns, and then rural areas, which directly affected the Bonda Mission Hospital. This was a fear for Taylor and the other medical staff at the mission, as it was thought that those who leave their home country are more susceptible to die from tuberculosis rather than the locals.

With the tuberculosis outbreak, there was a need for Taylor to apply for the Beit Trust again. Beit, with the government, funded the creation of a 45 bed block for tuberculosis patients with an X-ray unit and a diesel electric power unit in 1952. The X-rays were used for refraction and collagen estimations to determine the contralateral lung damage and the grade of the fibrosis in the patients who suffered from the pneumoconiosis symptoms.

With the 1951 expansion of the hospital, the original verandah was repurposed as the hospital chapel. The chapel was an important location as the center of the hospital to allow for the connection with God’s glory and the establishment of spiritual health with both mental and physical health.

Throughout Taylor’s 40 years at the missionary, Bonda Hospital was able to expand to a full size of 200 beds and over 100 staff members.

Legacy 
Taylor developed the Bonda Mission Hospital as well as a nursing education program. In 1962, the Birmingham Medical School sent a delegation to Rhodesia with the intent to establish the Salisbury Medical School within the Rhodesian region to open in 1963. Delegates included Kevin Bland, Professor McLaren, Professor Stammers and Dr. D.M. Blair.

Under Taylor's leadership, the "New Look" was established for missions in 1959 through both foundation and government funding.   The New Look recognized the necessary adjustment towards equitable salaries for those in mission work, especially those funded by an English establishment, including the Church of England. To prevent the distrust of the government and also allow for the continuation of the effort by the mission hospital, the revision was accomplished to at the minimum have the same equal starting salary of similar positions within the Government hospitals. At the time, nursing staff at the mission with Taylor received approximately half of the Government starting nursing salary and nursing orderlies was less than half of government nuring orderlies. Teaching staff at mission hospitals received equal pay to government teaching staff. This prompted the “best school students” to go into the field of teaching rather than into mission practice.

In addition to salaries, grants and donations at the "New Look" time were placed towards building new living quarters for the nursing staff and training through the (State Registered Nurses)S.R.N. The S.R.N. was originally the goal of the education program and establishment of the Bonda Mission Hospital.

Death 
Taylor died on May 4, 1987 near the Bonda Region in Harare, Mashonaland East, Zimbabwe.

References 

1908 births
1987 deaths
People from Manchester
Medical missionaries
Anglican missionaries in Zimbabwe